The Bataillon de Chasseurs Ardennais (or more figuratively, 'Ardennes Light Infantry') is an infantry formation in the Land Component of the Belgian Armed Forces. Originally formed in 1933 to ensure the defense of Belgium's Luxembourg Province including the natural region of the Ardennes and particularly noted for its role during the German invasion of 1940, the unit currently serves as a mechanized infantry formation and forms part of the Motorized Brigade. 

The Chasseurs ardennais were first formed as a light infantry unit in 1933 from the existing  to defend the largely rural region south of the Fortified Positions of Namur and the Liège. Considered a high-value élite unit, it was formed largely of volunteers from the region and was allocated more modern equipment than other units of the Belgian Army. After Belgium's return to neutrality in 1936, the role of the Chasseurs ardennais shifted and the formation expanded significantly. It eventually consisted of two army divisions complete with artillery and mobile units.

At the time of the German invasion of Belgium in May 1940, the Chasseurs ardennais proved more successful in combat than many other units and fought a number of successful small-scale actions against the German Army before the capitulation of the Belgian Army. After the war, the military traditions of the Chasseurs ardennais were revived in 1946. The formation formed part of the Belgian Forces in Germany and subsequently participated in a range of international peacekeeping and NATO missions. It was reduced to its current strength in 2011.

After its inception, the Chasseurs ardennais has adopted a distinctive green basque-style beret and insignia depicting a wild boar.

History

Creation and early history, 1933–1940

Belgian military planners had long been aware of the particular vulnerability of the Province of Luxembourg in the south-east which was situated in a relatively undefended region south of the Fortified Position of Namur and the Fortified Position of Liège. Albert Devèze, Liberal Minister of Defence from 1932 to 1936, demanded the creation of a new élite light infantry unit in the Belgian Army to protect the frontier in the region as part of his plan for the "integral defence of the territory" in the context of the ongoing military alliance with France. A similar idea had circulated for several decades previously. The idea was partly inspired by the France's Chasseurs alpins and Italy's Alpini. Devèze's policy was criticised by some at the time, including General Émile Galet, for diluting the strength of the Belgian Army across the entire length of the country's eastern frontier and therefore making it impossible to concentrating the army's strength effectively in any one place. 

On the initiative of Devèze and General , the existing  (10e Régiment de Ligne) based at Arlon was renamed the Regiment of Chasseurs ardennais (Régiment de Chasseurs ardennais, abbreviated to ChA) by royal decree on 10 March 1933. The new unit would be composed largely of volunteers rather than conscripts. Although the idea of a distinctive uniform was rejected, the Chasseurs adopted a distinctive green Basque-style beret in the style of the Chasseurs alpins. At the time, they were the only unit in the Belgian Army to wear a beret. At the same time, a series of 375 pillboxes were built along the Belgian frontier for the Chasseurs ardennais to defend as part of the so-called . As a replacement for the 10th Line Regiment, the 14th Line Regiment was created in June 1934. 

 
After its foundation, the Chasseurs ardennais underwent a significant period of organisational change and expansion. The original regiment was replaced by three separate battalions of Chasseurs ardennais in August 1934 which were intended to form part of three "mixed groups" based at Arlon, Vielsalm, and Bastogne, where they would be supported by recently formed and highly mobile Frontier Cyclists Units (Unités cyclistes frontière) as well as supporting artillery formations. These latter units were absorbed into the new Artillery Group of the Chasseurs Ardennais (Groupe d’Artillerie des Chasseurs ardennais) in September 1934. The three mixed groups and the artillery group were, in turn, merged into a single Corps of Chasseurs ardennais (Corps des Chasseurs ardennais) in November 1934 based in Arlon and later Namur. 

After the end of Belgium's alliance with France in 1936 and its return to neutrality, the idea of frontier defence was abandoned as militarily impractical. The Chasseurs ardennais were briefly threatened with disbandment. Their role was revised and there role in the event of a German invasion became to launch delaying actions while withdrawing to the other side of the Meuse river. Otherwise, the Chasseurs ardennais remained largely unchanged and continued to expand. The "mixed groups" were renamed "regiments" and the corps upgraded to a division between March and July 1937. The artillery group, in turn, was expanded and became the Regiment of Artillery of the Chasseurs Ardennais (Régiment d'Artillerie des Chasseurs ardennais) in September 1938. Following the mobilization of the Belgian Army in late 1939 this division comprised 35,000 men, and a second division of three more regiments was created. The 1st Division was commanded at the outbreak of war by General Victor Descamps; the 2nd Division by General François Ley.

From its inception, the Chasseurs ardennais received an unusually large portion in receiving modern equipment. These included the new Mauser Model 1935 rifle and FN Model 1930 machine gun. By 1938, each regiment had 16 T-13 tank destroyers and three T-15 light tanks.

Second World War, 1940

The German invasion of Belgium began in the early morning on 10 May 1940. As a result of this, lines of communications between the Belgian command with the local headquarters at Neufchâteau were disrupted and a number of Chasseurs ardennais units posted at the frontier did not receive the order to withdraw.

As the Belgian Army withdrew across the Meuse river on 10-11 May 1940, it proved impossible to establish a viable defensive position. The 1st Chasseurs Ardennais Division regrouped north of Namur and suffered heavy losses to German aerial attacks at Belgrade and Temploux suffering several hundred casualties. The two divisions were ordered to withdraw to the Leie (Lys) river in Flanders. Chasseurs ardennais units successfully held the front at Gottem, Deinze and Vinkt during the ensuing Battle of the Lys (24–28 May 1940) before the ultimate capitulation of the Belgian Army on 28 May 1940. The success of their resistance at Deinze and Vinkt provoked reprisal attacks against local civilians by the German 225th Infantry Division in the Vinkt massacre. As the historian Alain Colignon notes, the Chasseurs ardennais were "about the last to have maintained their cohesion and "fighting spirit" and performed significantly better than other Belgian infantry units in combat.

Postwar history, 1945–present
After the Liberation of Belgium in 1944, the Belgian Army was gradually reformed and a number of newly-recruited units were sent for training in Northern Ireland in the final months of the conflict. A number of former members of the Chasseurs ardennais had been recruited into the 1st Battalion of the newly founded 4th "Steenstraete" Infantry Brigade which returned to Belgium in November 1945 and was later deployed as part of the Belgian Army of Occupation to participate in the Allied occupation of Germany. As part of the reorganisation of Belgian unit traditions, this battalion became the Battalion of Chasseurs Ardennais (Bataillon des Chasseurs Ardennais) in March 1946 and subsequently the 1st Battalion of Chasseurs ardennais, assuming the traditions of the earlier 1st Regiment. The green beret was reinstated in February 1947. Five further battalions were later also re-established.

In subsequent years, Chasseurs ardennais units were deployed to the Belgian Congo and Ruanda-Urundi at the time of decolonisation. It also participated in peacekeeping operations in the former Yugoslavia. As part of the cuts to defense spending after the Cold War, the regiment was reduced to battalion-strength in 2011. It consisted of 415 men in 2015.

Battle honours
The unit's flag carries the following citations:
 Namur
 Termonde
 Yser
 Esen
 Kortemark
 Ardennes
 La Dendre 1940 
 Vinkt
Saint Hubertus is the patron saint of the unit.

Uniform and insignia
The Chasseurs ardennais have, since their inception, worn a distinctive light green Basque-style beret. This is larger than the berets subsequently adopted by other units of the Belgian Land Component in the post-war period. The cap badge depicts the head of a wild boar which are found in the Ardennes region.

Organisation
The Chasseurs Ardennais Battalion comprises: 
HQ staff 
1st company
2nd company 
3rd company
service company

References

Citations

Bibliography

Further reading

External links

Ardennian Rifles
Military units and formations established in 1933
1933 establishments in Belgium
Marche-en-Famenne
Boars in heraldry
Military units and formations of Belgium in World War II